Azerbaijan has many islands along the coast of the Caspian Sea. Most are part of the Baku Archipelago.

Baku Archipelago
 Boyuk Zira or Nargin 
 Daş Zirə or Vulf
 Qum Island or Peschany
 Tava Island or Plita

Islands located off the bay
These islands are detached from the main group:
 Sangi Mugan or Svinoy
 Zenbil or Duvanni
 Chikil or Oblivnoy
 Qara Su or Los
 Xara Zira or Bulla
 Qutan and Baburi Islands or Podvodnyye
 Adsiz Ada, Dasli Ada or Bezymyannyy
 Gil or Glinyanyy
 Kura Island or Kurinsky
 Kura Rock or Kurinsky Kamen

Not in Baku Archipelago
 Chilov
 Pirallahi Island or Artyom

Artificial Islands
Khazar Islands
Neft Daşları

 
Azerbaijan
Islands